Thomas "Tom" Francis Kiely (25 August 1869 – 6 November 1951) was an Irish athlete. Kiely won gold in the all-round at the 1904 Summer Olympics in St. Louis, Missouri, making him the first multi-event track and field champion of the Modern Olympic Games

Biography
Kiely was born in Banteer in County Cork, Ireland. the son of William and Mary (nee Downey) Keily. He attended Ballyneale National School where he started to take part in Gaelic football, hurling and athletics. He represented Tipperary at Hurling, playing for Munster when they beat Leinster in London. In addition, he was the captain of the Grangemockler Gaelic Football Team and on the same day as he represented Munster in the hurling match against Leinster he played Gaelic football for Ireland versus London-Irish at Stamford Bridge. In all, Kiely won 53 sporting titles and these were 38 Gaelic Athletic Association titles and Irish Amateur Athletic Association titles. He also won five English hammer throwing titles and two American all round championships.  Away from the sports field Kielt played the fiddle and the flute and was an accomplished Irish dancer.  

Kiely competed in the 1904 Summer Olympics held in St. Louis, Missouri, in the all-round, which consisted of 100 yd run, shot put, high jump, 880 yd walk, hammer throw, pole vault, 120 yd hurdles, 56 pounds weight throw, long jump and 1 mile run. All ten events were held on the same day. He won the gold medal, becoming the first multi-event track and field champion in the Modern Olympic Games.

Kiely was thirty-four at this time. The British team had approached him with promises of his fare and expenses, and American sponsorship was also offered but, as a committed nationalist, he decided to go on his own, representing his native country.  He raised the fare partly by selling many of the prizes he had won over the years and sailed to the US at the end of May.

In America he had several more offers to join the American or British teams. But again he declined and made it clear in all statements to the press that he would represent only Ireland in the Olympic Games. As Ireland was not independent in 1904 the International Olympic Committee lists him as representative of the team of Great Britain and Ireland at the 1904 Summer Olympics.

He died on 6 November 1951 at his home in Carrick-on-Suir and he was buried in the cemetery at Ballyneale. He is commemorated by a memorial at Ballyneale Church which was unveiled in 1970. In 2016 his gold medal was displayed at the Gaelic Athletic Association's Museum as part of the Irish Olympians exhibition.

References

External links
Ballyneale’s Tom Kiely: a legendary all-rounder, The Munster Express, 19 Feb 2010.

1869 births
1951 deaths
Athletes (track and field) at the 1904 Summer Olympics
Irish decathletes
Medalists at the 1904 Summer Olympics
Olympic athletes of Great Britain
Olympic gold medalists in athletics (track and field)
Olympic gold medallists for Great Britain
Sportspeople from County Tipperary